Class 316 and Class 457 were TOPS classifications assigned to a single electric multiple unit (EMU) at different stages of its use as a prototype for the Networker series.

Project
In the late 1980s, the Network SouthEast division of British Rail, which operated the railway network in South East England, started to develop a new standard train, known as the Networker. To test out the technical arrangements for the Networker, a test train was used, converted from former Class 210 carriages, which were built in 1982 by Derby Litchurch Lane Works as prototype 'Second Generation' Diesel Electric Multiple Unit (DEMU), but were withdrawn after a few years.

Class 457
Initially the test unit was formed for trials on the  system of the Southern Region, and was numbered 457001. As with all Southern Region electric multiple units only the last four digits of the unit number were actually carried.
The unit formation was:

Class 316
Later, the unit was altered to undertake trials on the  overhead line system used on electrified lines north of the River Thames. The unit was renumbered as a Class 316 unit, number 316999. To enable it to work on the AC electrification, a pantograph trailer from a Class 313 unit 313034 was inserted into the set, replacing one of the intermediate trailers. This spare vehicle (no. 67400) has since been incorporated into a Class 455/9 DC suburban unit, replacing a damaged Trailer Second Open (TSO) vehicle.

The unit formation was:

Preservation
After the AC trials were complete, the set was returned to the Southern Region for storage, minus the Class 313 trailer, which returned to its previous formation. The two driving cars were preserved at the Electric Railway Museum, Warwickshire, one being resold to the Eversholt Rail Group and inserted into set 455913 in 2013 after being rebuilt at Wolverton railway works to replace a carriage destroyed in an accident. The vehicle (67301) was converted to a 455 MSO. The remaining intermediate trailer was scrapped.

Vehicle details are shown below:

Alternative uses of the Class 316 number
Class 316 was originally reserved in the British Rail Fleet List for an AC EMU for the Piccadilly to Victoria (Picc-Vic) underground line proposed for Manchester in the 1970s. The specifications and some outline design proposals for the new fleet was prepared at the Railway Technical Centre but never proceeded to tender with the project cancelled.

The Class 316 designation was also used in 1992 for a three car Class 307 EMU used as a testbed unit for new traction equipment.

References

External links

457
457
Train-related introductions in 1989
Train-related introductions in 1990